100.9 Radyo Bandera (DYHG 100.9 MHz) is an FM station owned by Hypersonic Broadcasting Center and operated by Bandera News Philippines. Its studios and transmitter are located at 3rd Floor, FCD Bldg., McKinley St., Roxas, Capiz.

References

External links
Radyo Bandera Roxas FB Page

Radio stations in Capiz
Radio stations established in 2020